This is a list of electoral results for the electoral district of Ascot Vale in Victorian state elections.

Members for Ascot Vale

Election results

Elections in the 1980s

Elections in the 1970s

Elections in the 1950s

References

Victoria (Australia) state electoral results by district